Angel Nation is a Finnish symphonic metal band who originally went by Enkelination until 2016. The band formed in 2011, releasing a debut EP in 2012. As of 2022, the band released three albums and an EP.

Band members 
Current members
 Elina Siirala - lead vocals, keyboards (2011-present)
 Lucas Williamson - drums (2016-present)
 George Stergiou - rhythm guitar (2018-2021), lead guitar (2021-present)
 Nick Wilson - bass guitar (2022-present)

Former members
 Ben Welburn - drums (2011-2013)  
 Shadow Venger - lead guitar (2011-2016)
 Ivan Melo - rhythm guitar (2011-2012)
 Alasdair McNeill - bass guitar (2013-2014)
 Jozef Polom - rhythm guitar (2013-2014)
 Julia B. Cadau - bass guitar (2014-2022)
 Benjamin Tarten - drums (2014-2016)
 Sonny Antoniou - lead guitar (2017-2021)

Discography

Albums 

 Tears of Lust (2014)
 Aeon (2017)
 Antares (2022)

Singles/EPs 

 Never Ending            (2012)
 Do it Anyway            (2017)
 Burn The Witch          (2017)
 Breathe Again           (2017)
 Fly Away                (2021)
 Seraph                  (2022)
 ''Out of Sight, Out of Mind (2022)

References

Finnish symphonic metal musical groups